Daniel Zajfman (Hebrew: דניאל זייפמן - born June 7, 1959) is an Israeli physicist whose main research interests are centered on the physics of simple molecular ions. On December 1, 2006 he was elected as the tenth president of the Weizmann Institute.

Early life
Daniel Zajfman was born in Brussels, Belgium. He joined the Hashomer Hatzair movement while studying at the Athénée Robert Catteau. In 1979 he emigrated to Israel where he met his wife, Joëlle Hayoun. In 1983 he graduated in Physics (B.Sc.), at the Technion, Israel Institute of Technology, Haifa. He continued his studies at the Technion and in 1989 received his PhD, in atomic physics. He conducted his post-doctoral at the Argonne National Laboratory, Illinois, United States. (1989–1991)

Career
In 1991 he returned to Israel and began his career as a senior scientist at the Dept. of Particle Physics (Weizmann Institute of Science). In 1997, he was appointed Associate Professor and was promoted to full professor in 2003. Since 2001, he has been an external member of the Max Planck Institute for Nuclear Physics in Heidelberg, Germany, and in 2005, he was appointed as a Director at this Max Planck Institute.

On December 1, 2006 he was elected as the tenth president of the Weizmann Institute, the youngest ever. He was in turn succeeded in 2019 by Alon Chen.

On January 1, 2020, he was elected as the Chair of the Academic Board of the Israel Science Foundation.

Research and patents
His research focuses on the reaction dynamics of small molecules and how they influence the composition of the interstellar medium.  He recreates the conditions of outer space in the laboratory using special devices called 'ion traps' or 'storage rings'. In these devices, he is able to briefly store and measure the properties of small amounts of material, as little as a few hundred atoms or molecules-worth, under the extreme conditions of interstellar space (especially very low temperatures and low densities). Some of his research has focused on the puzzle of how complex molecules are formed in outer space.

Patents
 A Device for Three dimensional Imaging
 A new method for Mass Spectrometry

References

External links
 Weizmann Institute President Page
 Daniel Zajfman professional page

1959 births
Living people
Scientists from Brussels
Belgian Jews
Belgian emigrants to Israel
Israeli physicists
Academic staff of Weizmann Institute of Science
Presidents of Weizmann Institute of Science
Jewish physicists
Presidents of universities in Israel